Kmiczyn  is a village in the administrative district of Gmina Łaszczów, within Tomaszów Lubelski County, Lublin Voivodeship, in eastern Poland. The village has a population of 320.

References

Kmiczyn